The Ogoni languages, or Kegboid languages, are the five languages of the Ogoni people of Rivers State, Nigeria.

They fall into two clusters, East and West, with a limited degree of mutual intelligibility between members of each cluster. The Ogoni think of the cluster members as separate languages, however.

The classification of the Ogoni languages is as follows:
 East: Khana and Tẹẹ, with around 1,800,000 speakers between them, and Gokana, with about 250,000.
 West: Eleme, with about 90,000 speakers, and Baan, with around 50,500.

Names and locations
Below is a list of language names, populations, and locations from Blench (2019).

See also
List of Proto-Ogoni reconstructions (Wiktionary)

References

Blench, Roger and Kay Williamson. 2008. The Ogoni languages: comparative word list and historical reconstructions.

 
Cross River languages
Indigenous languages of Rivers State